Men's Overall World Cup 1980/1981

Final point standings

In Men's Overall World Cup 1980/81 the best five downhills, best five giant slaloms, best five slaloms and best three combined count.

World Cup
FIS Alpine Ski World Cup overall titles